Ice storage air conditioning is the process of using ice for thermal energy storage. The process can reduce energy used for cooling during times of peak electrical demand. Alternative power sources such as solar can also  use the technology to store energy for later use. This is practical because of water's large heat of fusion: one metric ton of water (one cubic metre) can store 334 megajoules (MJ) (317,000 BTU) of energy, equivalent to 93 kWh (26.4 ton-hours).  

The original definition of a "ton of cooling capacity" (heat flow) was the heat needed to melt one ton of ice in a 24-hour period.  This heat flow is what one would expect in a  house in Boston in the summer. This definition has since been replaced by less-archaic units: one ton of HVAC or refrigeration capacity is approximately equivalent to 3520 Watts.  A small storage facility can hold enough ice to cool a large building from one day to one week, whether that ice is produced by anhydrous ammonia chillers or hauled in by horse-drawn carts. 

Ground freezing can also be utilized; this may be done in ice form where the ground is saturated. Systems will also work with pure rock. Wherever ice forms, the ice formation's heat of fusion is not used, as the ice remains solid throughout the process. The method based on ground freezing is widely used for mining and tunneling to solidify unstable ground during excavations. The ground is frozen using bore holes with concentric pipes that carry brine from a chiller at the surface. Cold is extracted in a similar way using brine and used in the same way as for conventional ice storage, normally with a brine-to-liquid heat exchanger, to bring the working temperatures up to usable levels at higher volumes. The frozen ground can stay cold for months or longer, allowing cold storage for extended periods at negligible structure cost.

Replacing existing air conditioning systems with ice storage offers a cost-effective energy storage method, enabling surplus wind energy and other such intermittent energy sources to be stored for use in chilling at a later time, possibly months later.

Early ice storage, shipment, and production
Before the advent of mechanical refrigeration, ice was cut from frozen lakes or rivers and transported to cities for use as a coolant. Ice was widely shipped and stored year-round in icehouses. If there was no readily-accessible source of ice, then shallow, shaded pools were often built to nearby, and the ice removed from them during the freezing season.

Air conditioning 
The most widely used form of this technology can be found in campus-wide air conditioning or chilled water systems of large buildings. Air conditioning systems, especially in commercial buildings, are the biggest contributors to peak electrical loads seen on hot summer days in various countries. In this application, a standard chiller runs at night to produce an ice pile. Water then circulates through the pile during the day to produce chilled water that would normally be the chiller's daytime output.

A partial storage system minimizes capital investment by running the chillers nearly 24 hours a day. At night, they produce ice for storage and during the day they chill water for the air conditioning system. Water circulating through the melting ice augments their production. Such a system usually runs in ice-making mode for 16 to 18 hours a day and in ice-melting mode for six hours a day.  Capital expenditures are minimized because the chillers can be just 40 - 50% of the size needed for a conventional design. Ice storage sufficient to store half a day's rejected heat is usually adequate.

A full storage system minimizes the cost of energy to run that system by entirely shutting off the chillers during peak load hours. The capital cost is higher, as such a system requires somewhat larger chillers than those from a partial storage system, and a larger ice storage system. Ice storage systems are inexpensive enough that full storage systems are often competitive with conventional air conditioning designs.

The air conditioning chillers' efficiency is measured by their coefficient of performance (COP). In theory, thermal storage systems could make chillers more efficient because heat is discharged into colder nighttime air rather than warmer daytime air. In practice, heat loss overpowers this advantage, since it melts the ice.

Air conditioning thermal storage has been shown to be somewhat beneficial in society. Off-peak electricity is cheaper, as demand is lower. It also reduces the demand at peak times, which is often provided by expensive and unenvironmental sources.

A new twist on this technology uses ice as a condensing medium for the refrigerant. In this case, regular refrigerant is pumped to coils where it is used. Rather than needing a compressor to convert it back into a liquid, however, the low temperature of ice is used to chill the refrigerant back into a liquid. This type of system allows existing refrigerant-based HVAC equipment to be converted to Thermal Energy Storage systems, something that could not previously be easily done with chilled water technology. In addition, unlike water-cooled chilled water systems that do not experience a tremendous difference in efficiency from day to night, this new class of equipment typically displaces daytime operation of air-cooled condensing units. In areas where there is a significant difference between peak day time temperatures and off-peak temperatures, this type of unit is typically more energy efficient than the equipment that it replaces.

Combustion gas turbine air inlet cooling 
Thermal energy storage is also used for combustion gas turbine air inlet cooling. Instead of shifting electrical demand to the night, this technique shifts generation capacity to the day. To generate ice at night, the turbine is often mechanically connected to a large chiller's compressor. During peak daytime loads, water is circulated between the ice pile and a heat exchanger in front of the turbine air intake, cooling the intake air to near freezing temperatures. Since the air is colder, the turbine can compress more air with a given amount of compressor power.  Typically, both the generated electrical power and turbine efficiency rise when the inlet cooling system is activated. This system is similar to the compressed air energy storage system.

See also 
 Icehouse (early version)
 Energy storage
 Solar thermal energy
 Pumpable ice technology
 List of energy storage projects

References

Energy storage
Heating, ventilation, and air conditioning